Amar Shankar Sable is a Bharatiya Janata Party (BJP) politician. He is a Member of Parliament, representing Maharashtra in the Rajya Sabha the upper house of Indian Parliament. He is from Pimpri, Pune.

References

External links
Amar Shankar Sable - Rajya Sabha Profile

Living people
Rajya Sabha members from Maharashtra
People from Pimpri-Chinchwad
Bharatiya Janata Party politicians from Maharashtra
1963 births